The 2006 Subway Fresh 500, the eighth race of the 2006 NASCAR Nextel Cup Series season, was held at Phoenix International Raceway on April 22, 2006. Kyle Busch won the pole.

Qualifying

Race results

Failed to qualify: Chad Chaffin (#34), Mike Garvey (#51), Chad Blount (#92), Kevin Lepage (#61), Morgan Shepherd (#89), Steve Portenga (#52)

References

External links
 Official results

Subway Fresh 500
Subway Fresh 500
NASCAR races at Phoenix Raceway
April 2006 sports events in the United States